Katrin Green (née Katrin Laborenz, born 16 February 1985 in Ruthweiler, Germany) is a Paralympian athlete from Germany competing mainly in category T44 sprint events.

She competed in the 2008 Summer Paralympics in Beijing, China.  There she won a gold medal in the women's 200 metres - T44 event and finished fourth in the women's 100 metres - T44 event. For the winning of the golg medal 2008 at Pekig she was decorates by the President of the Fedearl Republic of Germany with the Silver Laurel Leaf, Germany's highest sport award.

At the 2012 Summer Paralympics in London she won a bronze medal in the women's 200 metres - T44 event.

She is married to U.S. athlete Roderick Green.

References

External links 
 

Paralympic athletes of Germany
Athletes (track and field) at the 2008 Summer Paralympics
Paralympic gold medalists for Germany
Recipients of the Silver Laurel Leaf
Paralympic bronze medalists for Germany
Living people
1985 births
Medalists at the 2008 Summer Paralympics
Medalists at the 2012 Summer Paralympics
Athletes (track and field) at the 2012 Summer Paralympics
Paralympic medalists in athletics (track and field)
German female sprinters